The "" (Dutch for "Crystal Bicycle") is a cycle racing award, created in 1992 by the Belgian newspaper Het Laatste Nieuws. The award is given annually to the Belgian rider considered to have performed the best over the year.

As of 2013, Johan Museeuw holds the record, winning the award five times. Only two cyclo-cross riders have won the award, Paul Herygers and Sven Nys, although Wout van Aert also won the trophy twice after already having shifted focus to road racing.

Other categories have been introduced at later stages, including the best young rider award in 1994, the best cycling manager award in 2000, the best domestique award in 2005 and the best female rider in 2016. The latter award is commonly referred to as the Crystal Drop of Sweat.

Recipients

External links
 Het Laatste Nieuws Website 

Cycle racing in Belgium
Sports trophies and awards
Cycling awards